Małysiak is a Polish surname. Notable people with the surname include:

 Albin Małysiak (1917–2011), Polish bishop
 Andrzej Małysiak (born 1957), Polish ice hockey player

See also
 

Polish-language surnames